Sanremo grande amore is an extended play by Italian operatic pop trio Il Volo, released in February 2015 following their appearance at the 65th Sanremo Music Festival, in which their song "Grande amore" received first prize in the "Big Artists" category.
"Grande amore", released as the set's lead single on 12 February 2015, is the only original composition of the EP. The remaining six tracks are covers of popular Italian songs. Sanremo grande amore is also Il Volo's first release for their new label, Sony Music.

Track listing

Charts

Year-end charts

Personnel

Il Volo

 Gianluca Ginoble - Baritone
 Piero Barone - Tenor
 Ignazio Boschetto - Tenor

Musicians

 Celso Valli - Arrangements, production, orchestra conductor, piano and keyboards
 Mattia Tedesco - Electric and acoustic guitars
 Paolo Prosperini - Gipsy guitar
 Massimo Varini - Acoustic guitar (tracks 5 and 6)
 Cesare Chiodo - bass
 Paolo Valli - drums
 Tommy Ruggero - percussions
 Stefano Bussoli - timpani
 Massimo Tagliata - accordion
 CV Strings Ensemble - Strings
 Valentino Corvino - first violin
 Stefano di Battista - Saxophone (track 2)

Technical crew

 Celso Valli, Michele Torpedine - production
 Enrico Capalbo, Roberto Bartilucci - audio engineering 
 Marco Borsatti - audio engineering, mastering 
 Giordano Mazzi - editing 
 Maurizio Biancani - mastering

Certifications

References

2015 EPs
Sony Music Italy EPs
Italian-language EPs
Il Volo albums